Suburban Light is the debut studio album by English indie pop band The Clientele. The album was released on 28 November 2000 by Pointy Records in the United Kingdom. In 2001, it was released by Merge Records in the United States. Suburban Light contains several tracks originally released on singles and compilations from 1997 through 2000.

Release
The track "We Could Walk Together" first appeared on the Fierce Panda Records compilation Cry Me a Liver in November 1997. Several other tracks were issued as 7-inch singles across various labels: "What Goes Up" / "Five Day Morning" on Pointy Records in June 1998, "Reflections After Jane" / "An Hour Before the Light" on Johnny Kane Records in March 1999, "Lacewings" / "Saturday" on Motorway Records in September 1999, "I Had to Say This" / "Monday's Rain" on Pointy Records in December 1999, and "(I Want You) More Than Ever" / "6AM Morningside" on Elefant Records in February 2000. "Bicycles" first appeared on the March Records EP A Fading Summer in May 2000.

Critical reception

In 2009, Suburban Light was ranked at number 80 on Pitchforks list of the best albums of the 2000s. In 2018, Pitchfork listed it at number 21 on its list of the 30 best dream pop albums.

Track listing

Personnel
Credits for Suburban Light adapted from album liner notes.

The Clientele
 Alasdair MacLean – vocals, guitar
 James Hornsey – bass
 Mark Keen – drums

Additional musicians
 Daniel Evans – drums
 Howard Monk – drums

Artwork and design
 Seonad MacLean – photography
 Marianna Parker – photography
 Basia Taboda – sleeve design

References

External links
 
 

2000 debut albums
The Clientele albums
Merge Records albums